Nanhoï Nikolai Kinski (born July 30, 1976) is a French-American film actor, who has also done work in television and on stage. He was born in Paris, and grew up in California. Currently residing in Berlin, he has acted primarily in American and German films, and speaks English, German, and French. He is a citizen of both the U.S. and France.

He is the only son of the German actor Klaus Kinski and his third wife, Minhoi Geneviève Loanic. He is the half-brother of actresses Pola Kinski and Nastassja Kinski, and through Nastassja, the uncle of model Kenya Kinski-Jones.

Early life and education
Kinski was born in 1976 in Paris, to German actor Klaus Kinski, and his third wife, Minhoi Geneviève Loanic, a model of 19 when they met, who was born in Vietnam and came with her family to France at the age of seven. His father had two older daughters, Pola Kinski and Nastassja Kinski, born in Germany to his first and second wives, respectively. He took his family to California, where Nikolai lived mostly with his mother after his parents divorced in 1979. He was never close to his half-sisters, who lived most of the time in Germany.

Acting career
Kinski's father encouraged his interest in acting. His first role was at the age of 13 alongside his father in the film Kinski Paganini (1989). In the mid-1990s, he entered the UCLA School of Theatre as a theatre major and graduated from there.

Afterward Kinski moved to Berlin, where he learned to speak German fluently. He has since starred in a number of German language films and TV series, in addition to American works. He starred in Æon Flux (2005) alongside Charlize Theron.

In 2006, Kinski won the Romy Award as best newcomer.

Filmography

Notes

External links

1976 births
Living people
Male actors from Paris
French emigrants to the United States
American male film actors
American people of German descent
American people of Polish descent
American film actors of Vietnamese descent
French male film actors
French male television actors
French male child actors
French people of German descent
French people of Polish descent
French people of Vietnamese descent